Mabilleodes lithosialis is a moth in the family Crambidae. It was described by George Hampson in 1899. It is found in the South Africa.

References

Endemic moths of South Africa
Moths described in 1899
Odontiinae